Kerianthera is a genus of flowering plants belonging to the family Rubiaceae.

Its native range is Brazil.

Species:

Kerianthera longiflora 
Kerianthera preclara

References

Rubiaceae
Rubiaceae genera